Gandhinagar Rendava Veedhi is a 1987 Indian Telugu-language comedy film, produced by G. Reddy Shekar, J.Gopal Reddy and P. Pardhasaradhi Reddy under the Suseela Arts banner, Presented by Sarath Babu and directed by P. N. Ramachandra Rao. It stars Rajendra Prasad, Chandra Mohan, Gautami and music composed by G. Anand. The film is the debut of actress Gautami in the film industry and was released on 16 July 1987. The film is a remake of the Malayalam film Gandhinagar 2nd Street (1986).

Plot 
Prasad (Chandra Mohan) a middle-class employee who stays along with his mother & sister, suffers from financial problems due to low income. In that critical situation, his unemployed childhood friend Prabhu (Rajendra Prasad) falls on him in search of a job. Prasad tries to get rid of him in many ways but fails. At the same time, Prasad observes a spate of robberies are taking place at his working place Gandhinagar 2nd street and the colony decides to appoint a Gorkha (security guard). Now Prasad makes a plan and poses Prabhu as Raam Singh, a Nepali émigré, to fulfill the residents' need. Sharada (Jaya Sudha) works as a teacher in that colony whose husband Ravi (Sarath Babu) is working in Dubai. Prabhu takes care of Sharada as his own sister. Meanwhile, a police officer (Ranganath) and his daughter Geeta (Gauthami) move into the neighborhood which brings back Prabhu's memories. The rest of the film deals with the what is the relation between Prabhu & Geetha and whether their love becomes true or not?

Cast 

Rajendra Prasad as Prabhu / Ram Singh
Chandra Mohan as Prasad
Sarath Babu as Ravi
Jaya Sudha as Sharada Teacher
Gautami as Geeta
Ranganath as C.I.
Suthi Veerabhadra Rao as Srikalam
Mallikarjuna Rao as Constable
Balaji
Hema Sundar
Gummaluuri Sastry
Satti Babu
Dham
Rama Prabha as Bharathi
Kakinada Shyamala as Sarpakam
Tatineni Rajeswari as Geeta's mother
Dubbing Janaki as Prasad's mother

Soundtrack 
Music composed by G. Anand was released on SEA Records Company.

References

External links 
 

1980s Telugu-language films
1987 comedy-drama films
1987 films
Indian comedy-drama films
Telugu remakes of Malayalam films